Sheral Mar (born 1964) is a Fijian international female lawn bowler.

Biography
Mar won a triples bronze medal with Litia Tikoisuva and Elizabeth Moceiwai at the 2015 Asia Pacific Bowls Championships in New Zealand.

In 2016 she was selected to compete in the 2016 World Outdoor Bowls Championship and four years later in 2020 she was selected for the 2020 World Outdoor Bowls Championship in Australia. In between she competed at the 2018 Commonwealth Games.

In 2022, she competed in the women's triples and the Women's fours at the 2022 Commonwealth Games.

References

Living people
1964 births
Fijian female bowls players
Bowls players at the 2018 Commonwealth Games
Bowls players at the 2022 Commonwealth Games
Commonwealth Games competitors for Fiji
Sportspeople from Suva